This is the results breakdown of the local elections held in the Community of Madrid on 22 May 2011. The following tables show detailed results in the autonomous community's most populous municipalities, sorted alphabetically.

Overall

City control
The following table lists party control in the most populous municipalities, including provincial capitals (shown in bold). Gains for a party are displayed with the cell's background shaded in that party's colour.

Municipalities

Alcalá de Henares
Population: 204,120

Alcobendas
Population: 110,080

Alcorcón
Population: 168,299

Coslada
Population: 91,218

Fuenlabrada
Population: 198,973

Getafe
Population: 169,130

Leganés
Population: 187,227

Madrid

Population: 3,273,049Main article, avoid duplication

Móstoles
Population: 206,015

Parla
Population: 120,182

Torrejón de Ardoz
Population: 118,441

See also
2011 Madrilenian regional election

References

Madrid
2011